Erdahl may refer to:

Erdahl (surname)
Erdahl, Minnesota, United States
Erdahl Township, Grant County, Minnesota, United States